Actinoptera vinsoni is a species of tephritid or fruit flies in the genus Actinoptera of the family Tephritidae.

Distribution
Mauritius.

References

Tephritinae
Insects described in 1946
Diptera of Africa